, or more formally , was an Empress consort of Japan. She was the consort of Emperor Go-Daigo of Japan. She was given the regnal name  in 1332 when her husband was banished, but it was abolished when he returned to the chrysanthemum throne in 1333. Later she was given the second regnal name  upon her death. She was also an excellent poet, 14 of whose waka poetry are included in chokusen wakashū (imperially-commissioned anthologies).

Biography 

She was born as the 3rd daughter of Saionji Sanekane (西園寺実兼). She eloped with then-Crown Prince Takaharu (later Emperor Go-Daigo) in 1313 and officially got married with him in 1314. Prince Takaharu acceded to the throne as Emperor Go-Daigo in the 2nd lunar month, 1318 and Kishi was made  in the 4th lunar month of the same year. She was made Empress consort (chūgū) in the 8th lunar month, 1319.

Although vol. 1 of the historical epic Taiheiki tells she lost the emperor's favor because of her lady-in-waiting Ano Renshi (mother of Emperor Go-Murakami), Hiromi Hyodo, a Japanese literature researcher, claims that the story is the imitation of a poem by Bai Juyi, and in the real history Kishi and Go-Daigo were a close and affectionate couple. Other sources such as vol. 4 of the same epic (as later illustrated in Taiheiki Emaki, vol. 2), Masukagami, several historical documents, and poetry by the couple's own hands, show the deep intimacy between the emperor and empress.

Emperor Go-Daigo was captured and exiled to the Oki Islands by the Kamakura shogunate in the 3rd lunar month, 1332 and Kishi became a Buddhist nun in the 8th month the same year. Emperor Go-Daigo escaped from the Oki Islands and returned to Kyoto in the 6th lunar month, 1333. After that, Kishi resumed the title of Empress consort (chūgū) and a little later was made . She died on the 10th lunar month 12th, 1333.

Issue:
 princess (1314–?), died young
 Imperial Princess Kanshi (懽子内親王) (Senseimon-in, 宣政門院) (1315–1362), Saiō at Ise Shrine; later, married to Emperor Kōgon

Notes 

Japanese empresses
1333 deaths
Emperor Go-Daigo
14th-century Buddhist nuns
Japanese Buddhist nuns
Medieval women poets
Japanese women poets
People from Kyoto